Akofa Edjeani (born 20 February 1969) is a Ghanaian veteran film actress, producer and entrepreneur. Her short film, Not My Daughter (a film about female genital mutilation), won Best Short Film award at the African Movie Academy Awards (AMAA) in 2008, and I Sing of a Well, the movie she starred in and co-produced, won three awards and the Best Jury Award from African Movie Academy Awards in 2010.

Early life and education 
Akofa was born on 20 February 1969 in Ghana. She had her secondary school education at Mawuli School where she started acting as a member of the school's drama club. She holds a bachelor's degree in arts from the University of Ghana Performing Arts and a certificate in PR, Marketing and advertising from the Ghana Institute of Journalism (1995). She is the sister of Constance Ama Emefa Edjeani-Afenu

Career 
Edjeani is an actress by profession, she studied Performing Arts at the University of Ghana. She has acted in several Ghanaian and Nigerian-Ghanaian movies since mid 1990s. In 1995, she acted in For Better For Worse, 2015 she featured in the British-Ghanaian award-winning movie, The Cursed Ones. She was a member of the Interim Governing Council of the Ghana Culture Forum.

Personal life 
Edjeani was married to Robert Asiedu for over 20 years, the couple later separated and divorced. In July 2018, she made it known in an interview with Deloris Frimpong Manso, on her show, The Delay Show that she was divorced but dating and planning to remarry. She has two children.

Other ventures 
Edjeani runs a restaurant in Kanda, Accra, as at 2016 she made it known in an interview that set up the restaurant 17 years ago to sell food to support her family.

Selected filmography 

For Better For Worse 1995
Dirty Tears
Jennifer
When the Heart Decides
Harvest at 17
Divine Love
ꞌꞌExpectationsꞌꞌ
Holby City
My Mother's Heart 1&2
Life in Slow Motion
Pieces of Me
The Cursed Ones
Children of the Mountain
Sidechic Gang
Lucky
Azali
Cant Say Mother
Dark Spot
Fools in Love
Not my Daughter
I Sing of a Well
Aloe Vera

See also 

 Ama K. Abebrese
 Rama Brew

References

External links 

 
Delay Interviews Akorfa Edjeani
Time with Akofa Edjeani | Breakfast Daily

Ghanaian film actresses
20th-century Ghanaian actresses
21st-century Ghanaian actresses
Living people
Ghanaian film producers
Ghanaian women film producers
1969 births
University of Ghana alumni
Ghana Institute of Journalism alumni
Mawuli School alumni
Ghanaian businesspeople